The 2004 Tour de Suisse was the 68th edition of the Tour de Suisse cycle race and was held from 12 June to 20 June 2004. The race started in Sursee and finished in Lugano. The race was won by Jan Ullrich of the T-Mobile team.

Teams
Eighteen teams of eight riders started the race:

 
 
 
 Chocolade Jacques–Wincor Nixdorf

Route

Stages

Stage 1
12 June 2004 - Sursee to Beromünster,

Stage 2
13 June 2004 - Dürrenroth to Rheinfelden,

Stage 3
14 June 2004 - Rheinfelden to Juraparc-Vallorbe,

Stage 4
15 June 2004 - Vallée de Joux to Bätterkinden,

Stage 5
16 June 2004 - Bätterkinden to Adelboden,

Stage 6
17 June 2004 - Frutigen to Linthal,

Stage 7
18 June 2004 - Linthal to Malbun,

Stage 8
19 June 2004 - Buchs to Bellinzone,

Stage 9
20 June 2004 - Lugano to Lugano,  (ITT)

General classification

References

2004
Tour de Suisse